Paul Ky-Kidd RBSA is a Birmingham-based artist. He has exhibited at both the Ikon Gallery and the Custard Factory in Birmingham, and is a Member of the Royal Birmingham Society of Artists. He often paints the more rural locations, such as farms and villages, around Birmingham. Though he is a landscape painter, he initially trained as a sculptor.

References

Members and Associates of the Royal Birmingham Society of Artists